Konstantiniyye was a Turkish language online magazine published online by the Islamic State (IS), and released by al-Hayat Media Center. Konstantiniyye is the old Ottoman name for present day Istanbul.

The magazine published anti-Turkish messages and targeted Turkish president Recep Tayyip Erdoğan, and the current Peoples' Democratic Party, as well as one of its  militant enemies, the PKK.

In late 2016, Konstantiniyye was supplanted by Rumiyah.

See also
Dabiq (magazine)
Dar al-Islam (magazine)
Istok (magazine)

References

2015 establishments in Turkey
2016 disestablishments in Turkey
Defunct political magazines
Islamic State of Iraq and the Levant mass media
Magazines established in 2015
Magazines disestablished in 2016
Online magazines
Propaganda newspapers and magazines
Turkish-language magazines